= NU football =

The phrase NU football can refer to one of the following American football teams:

- Nebraska Cornhuskers football
- Northwestern Wildcats football
